Budoy  is a Philippine drama television series broadcast by ABS-CBN. The show is topbilled by Gerald Anderson, Jessy Mendiola and Enrique Gil. The show aired on the network's Primetime Bida evening block from October 10, 2011, to March 9, 2012, replacing Guns and Roses and was replaced by Dahil Sa Pag-ibig.

Series overview

Episodes

2011

2012

References

Budoy
2010s television-related lists